The House Opposite is a 1917 British silent drama film directed by Walter West and Frank Wilson and starring Matheson Lang, Violet Hopson and Ivy Close. It was based on a play by Perceval Landon.

Cast
 Matheson Lang as Henry Rivers MP
 Violet Hopson as Mrs. Anstruther
 Ivy Close as Mrs. Rivers
 Gregory Scott as Richard Cardyne
 Dora De Winton
 J. Hastings Batson
 Terence O'Brien
 Dora Barton

References

External links

1917 films
British silent feature films
Films directed by Walter West
1917 drama films
British drama films
British films based on plays
Broadwest films
British black-and-white films
1910s English-language films
1910s British films
Silent drama films